An election to Cork City Council took place on 20 June 1985 as part of that year's Irish local elections. 31 councillors were elected from six electoral divisions by PR-STV voting for a six-year term of office.

Results by party

Results by Electoral Area

Cork North-Central

Cork North-East

Cork North-West

Cork South-Central

Cork South-East

Cork South-West

External links
 http://www.corkcity.ie/
irishelectionliterature

1985 Irish local elections
1985